Marcelien Bos-de Koning (born 10 May 1978) is a Dutch three-time world champion and Olympic silver medalist sports sailor. She represented her country at the 2008 Summer Olympics in Qingdao. With crew member Lobke Berkhout Bos-de Koning took the silver medal as helmsman in the Women's 470. Bos-de Koning returned as crew member to the 2012 Olympic match regatta's in Weymouth in the Elliott 6m. With helmsman Renee Groeneveld and fellow crew member Annemieke Bes Bos-de Koning took 8th place.

Roles and awards

Roles within the ISAF
Bos-de Koning held the following positions within the International Sailing Federation:
 2005 until now, Chairmen ISAF Athletes' Commission
 2009 member of ISAF Equipment working committee
 2011 member of ISAF 2016 Olympic Format working party

Other roles
 Ambassador NOC – NSF Beijing 2008,
 Ambassador Earth Water,
 Ambassador Loot school Tabor Hoorn, (youth sport development)

Awards
 Order of Orange-Nassau

References

External links
 
 
 

1978 births
Living people
Dutch female sailors (sport)
Sailors at the 2008 Summer Olympics – 470
Sailors at the 2012 Summer Olympics – Elliott 6m
Olympic sailors of the Netherlands
Olympic silver medalists for the Netherlands
People from Hoorn
Olympic medalists in sailing
Medalists at the 2008 Summer Olympics
Knights of the Order of Orange-Nassau
Europe class sailors
470 class world champions
World champions in sailing for the Netherlands
Sportspeople from North Holland